Knockouts and Knockouts Haircuts for Men are the trade names of a privately held American salon chain (international as of early 2011), Knockouts LLC, based in Irving, Texas. Knockouts are full-service grooming salons with a boxing (and mixed martial arts)/sex appeal theme targeting men seeking an alternative to the cut-rate chain salons. The Today Show (NBC TV), The Big Idea with Donny Deutsch (CNBC) and other media have compared Knockouts to Hooters restaurants for the sex appeal/entertainment angle used to engage customers, labeling Knockouts “the Hooters of Haircutting.” The salons have a gym/warehouse-like decor with faux boxing ring posts and ropes and a brick wall helping to define the space, as well as boxing photos and memorabilia on the walls. There are flat-screen televisions at each grooming station and in the waiting area. These are usually tuned to sports programs, but are individually controlled by the customer.

Knockouts employs an attractive all-female staff of licensed hair stylists and massage therapists. The services include haircuts, hair coloring, waxing, manicures, pedicures, and six types of massage therapy. Grooming products are also available for purchase. Some locations also offer hair replacement and facial shaves. Knockouts salons provide a free beverage to customers while they wait, including water, sports drinks and beer (where legally permitted). Knockouts has sold over 500 franchised salons in 29 states.

History
The enterprise was founded as a limited partnership by Thomas P. Friday, his wife, Karin in Dallas, Texas in the summer of 2002. The first Knockouts salon opened on October 3, 2003 in Addison, Texas. In January 2005, the Fridays bought majority control in the partnership. The partnership was converted to a limited liability company, Knockouts LLC, in January 2008 and is now based in Irving, Texas. Tom Friday is chief executive officer of the company, while Karin Friday is President and Steve Turman is chief compliance officer.

Knockouts Girls

A Knockouts Girl is a licensed Cosmetologist and/or Barber or a licensed Massage Therapist employed by a Knockouts salon. They are recognizable by their uniform, which features a white or red cotton top with the Knockouts logo on the front paired with short satin boxing shorts. There are other shorts and shirts that can be worn together, or paired with an outfit more suitable for cold weather. The company also uses other colors and designs for tops, such as a jersey or other athletic wear. The remainder of the uniform consists of white “scrunch” socks and white athletic shoes.

Promotions
Knockouts has partnered with AXE, a division of Unilever. It is a co-branding program whereby AXE men's grooming products are used, sampled, and sold in Knockouts salons, and the Knockouts Girls wear shirts with both companies' logos and slogans. The companies believe AXE's "Hair Crisis Relief: get girl-approved hair" campaign fits with Knockouts' sporty/sexy image.

Knockouts currently sponsors an automobile NASCAR racing series team consisting of drivers Bret Guzik and Matt Barndt, as well as Dawson Guzik, a racer in the American Motocross Association. Knockouts has sponsored the Indiana Ice of the United States Hockey League and mixed martial arts fighter Michelle Waterson.

The Knockouts Girls and the Executive Team of Knockouts LLC give annually to under-privileged, orphaned children worldwide. They also sponsor foster parents that provide full-time care for these little ones until suitable homes can be found for them. Additionally, the Knockouts Girls volunteer their time and energy for charitable events that are sponsored by non-profit organizations. Knockouts supports the National Childhood Cancer Foundation and St. Baldrick's Foundation, which raises money for research to combat cancer in children.

Knockouts has also been featured on Your World with Neil Cavuto (Fox TV) as well as numerous other local television and print media. Specially-chosen Knockouts Girls appear in a calendar sold at the salons, but all Knockouts Girls make public appearances to promote their salons, the brand, and charities.

References

External links
Official website

Franchises
American companies established in 2002
Retail companies established in 2002
Retail companies of the United States
Companies based in Irving, Texas
2002 establishments in Texas